The Super Match is a name for a football rivalry between two South Korean football teams from the Seoul Capital Area, FC Seoul and Suwon Samsung Bluewings. The match and the rivalry between the two teams is regarded as the biggest in South Korean K League.

The first match was played in 1996. The rivalry became more fierce in 2004, after Anyang LG Cheetahs relocated to Seoul and changed the club's name to FC Seoul.

History

In 1996, neighboring Gyeonggi cities of Anyang and Suwon started hosting K League clubs. LG Cheetahs (currently FC Seoul), based in Seoul between 1990 and 1995, has relocated to Anyang under decentralization policy in K League. Suwon has hosted the newly founded Suwon Samsung Bluewings since that year.

For Suwon in early days, main rivals were Ulsan Hyundai and Pusan Daewoo which had fierce showdowns in the league finals in 1996 and 1997. Anyang and Suwon became rivals between 1998 and 1999, after former Suwon assistant coach Cho Kwang-rae joined Anyang and former Anyang player Seo Jung-won transferred to Suwon after his short spell with RC Strasbourg to beat Anyang 5–1 in the 1999 Korean Super Cup. Also a fact that the club's parent companies (LG Electronics and Samsung Electronics) being industrial arch rivals, boosted the rivalry. The match up was informally named Jijidae Derby in 2003, after a hill on the National Route 1 connecting two cities.

The rivalry between the two clubs became more fierce after 2004, when Anyang LG Cheetahs relocated back to Seoul and changed the club's name to FC Seoul. Since then, the rivalry has been promoted heavily by the league and media for commercial reasons, and is officially named "Super Match" since 2009.

Venues

Players who have played for both clubs
  Kim Dong-hae (Seoul: 1989–1995 / Suwon: 1996)
  Park Chul-woo (Seoul: 1992–1994 / Suwon: 1996–1997)
  Seo Jung-won (Seoul: 1992–1997 / Suwon: 1999–2004)
  Park Jung-suk (Suwon: 1996–2000 / Seoul: 2001–2007)
  Lee Ki-hyung (Suwon: 1996–2002 / Seoul: 2005–2006)
  Vitaliy Parakhnevych (Suwon: 1998–2000 / Seoul: 2001)
  Tuta (Seoul: 2002 / Suwon: 2003)
  Lee Jung-soo (Seoul: 2002–2004 / Suwon: 2006–2008, 2016–2017)
  Han Dong-won (Seoul: 2002–2006 / Suwon: 2012)
  Lee Jong-min (Suwon: 2002–2004 / Seoul: 2008–2012 / Suwon: 2013)
  Baek Ji-hoon (Seoul: 2005–2006 / Suwon: 2006–2016)
  Park Sung-bae (Seoul: 2005–2006 / Suwon: 2007)
  Choi Jae-soo (Seoul: 2004–2007 / Suwon: 2012–2015)
  Cho Chan-ho (Suwon: 2015 / Seoul: 2016–2017)
  Lee Sang-ho (Suwon: 2009–2016 / Seoul: 2017–2018)
  Dejan Damjanović (Seoul: 2008–2013, 2016–2017 / Suwon: 2018–2019)
  Cho Ji-hun (Suwon: 2011–2018 / Seoul: 2022–present)

Match reports
All times are KST (UTC+09:00).

League matches

1990s

2000s

2010s

2020s

League Cup matches

FA Cup matches

Super Cup matches

AFC Champions League matches

Records and statistics
 As of 9 October 2022.
 K League official match statistics are including Anyang LG Cheetahs statistics.
 All records and statistics are based on K League official FC Seoul vs Suwon Samsung Bluewings all-time statistics.
 Penalty shoot-outs results are counted as a drawn match.

All-time results

Top goalscorers

 Goals against both teams
  Seo Jung-won (3 goals against Suwon, 3 goals against Seoul)
  Lee Sang-ho (4 goals against Seoul, 1 goal against Suwon)
  Dejan Damjanović (7 goals against Suwon, 2 goals against Seoul)

Largest victories

Highest attendances

Honours

References

FC Seoul
Suwon Samsung Bluewings
Football rivalries in South Korea
Nicknamed sporting events